Adam Hieronim Sieniawski (1623 or 1624 – 1650) was a Polish noble

He was the son of Prokop Sieniawski and Eufrozyna née Chodkiewicz.

He was a starost of Lwów since 1648 and Field Clerk of the Crown since 1649.

On 15 February 1643 he was married to Elżbieta (Wiktoria Elżbieta) Potocka, daughter of Stanisław "Rewera" Potocki. Their son was Mikołaj Hieronim Sieniawski.

Footnotes 

1623 births
1650 deaths
Adam